Rhagonycha is a genus of soldier beetle belonging to the family Cantharidae.  There are at least 140 described species recorded from Europe, North America and Japan, and thought to date from the Upper Eocene to recent periods.

Subgenera and notable species
BioLib lists two subgenera:
 subgenus Rhagonycha Eschscholtz, 1830
 Rhagonycha fulva (Scopoli, 1763) - the common red soldier beetle is the type species (as Cantharis fulva Scopoli, 1763, misidentified as C. melanura L., 1758)
 Rhagonycha testacea (Linnaeus, 1758)
 List of other Rhagonycha species
 subgenus Ussurycha Kazantsev, 1995 (monotypic)
 Rhagonycha kazantsevi Svihla, 1995

References

Beetles of Europe
Cantharidae
Articles containing video clips